Jiuzhen (Vietnamese: Cửu Chân, Chinese: 九真) was a Chinese commandery within Jiaozhou. It is located in present-day Thanh Hóa Province, Vietnam.

Michel Ferlus (2012) and Frédéric  Pain (2020) propose that 九真 Old Chinese *kuˀ-cin transcribed *k.cin, a local autonym which is reflected in Puoc ksiːŋ muːl & Thavung ktiːŋ² meaning "human being, people", the latter from Proto-Vietic *kciːŋ, which consists of prefix *k- and *ciɲ (“leg, foot”); thus, "human beings" are "(those who are) on foot", "those who stand on their feet."

Pain further suggests that " might therefore have been inhabited by some ancestors of the Southern Vietic Thavung - Aheu."

References

Sources
 
 

Former commanderies of China in Vietnam
Commanderies of the Han dynasty